The 2020 Summit League men's basketball tournament was the postseason men's basketball tournament for the Summit League for the 2019–20 season. All tournament games were played at the Denny Sanford Premier Center in Sioux Falls, South Dakota, from March 7–10, 2020.
First-seeded North Dakota State defeated North Dakota, 89-53, to set the Summit League Tournament record for the largest margin victory in the title game. They earned the Summit League's automatic bid to the NCAA Tournament, but it was canceled days after NDSU won due to the Covid-19 Pandemic.

Seeds
The top eight teams by conference record in the Summit League compete in the conference tournament. Teams are seeded by record within the conference, with a tiebreaker system to seed teams with identical conference records. The tiebreakers operate in the following order:
 Head-to-head record.
 Record against the top-seeded team not involved in the tie, going down through the standings until the tie is broken.

Schedule and results

Bracket

All-Tournament Team
The following players were named to the All-Tournament Team:

References

Tournament
Summit League men's basketball tournament
Basketball in South Dakota
Basketball competitions in Sioux Falls, South Dakota
College basketball tournaments in South Dakota

Summit League men's basketball tournament
Summit League men's basketball tournament